Antonio De Sanctis (born 18 October 1972) is an Italian bobsledder. He competed in the four man event at the 2006 Winter Olympics.

References

External links
 

1972 births
Living people
Italian male bobsledders
Olympic bobsledders of Italy
Bobsledders at the 2006 Winter Olympics
People from Alessandria
Sportspeople from the Province of Alessandria